Ammonium hexafluorotitanate is the inorganic compound with the chemical formula (NH4)2[TiF6].  A colorless salt, the compound consists of ammonium ions and the hexafluorotitanate dianion.  It is encountered in the extraction of titanium from its principal ore ilmenite: the ore is treated with excess ammonium fluoride:

After removal of iron impurities, the titanium is recovered as a hydrated titanium dioxide by treatment of the aqueous extract of the hexafluoride with ammonia:

Structure
Many salts of hexafluorotitanate have been characterized by X-ray crystallography. In the lattice [TiF6]2- octahedra interact with the ammonium cations by hydrogen bonds.

References

Fluorine compounds
Titanium(IV) compounds
Fluorometallates